The third season of the television comedy series Arrested Development aired between September 19, 2005 and February 10, 2006, on Fox in the United States. It consists of 13 episodes, each running approximately 22 minutes in length. The third season was released on DVD in region 1 on August 29, 2006, in region 2 on April 23, 2007 and in region 4 on December 6, 2006. This was the final season of Arrested Development to be aired on Fox, as they had decided to cancel the series. However, Netflix revived the show in 2013 for a fourth season.

The show's storyline centers on the Bluth family, a formerly wealthy, habitually dysfunctional family and is presented in a continuous format, incorporating hand-held camera work, narration, archival photos and historical footage.

Cast 

 Jason Bateman as Michael Bluth
 Portia de Rossi as Lindsay Fünke
 Will Arnett as Gob Bluth
 Michael Cera as George Michael Bluth
 Alia Shawkat as Maeby Fünke
 Tony Hale as Buster Bluth
 David Cross as Tobias Fünke
 Jeffrey Tambor as George and Oscar Bluth
 Jessica Walter as Lucille Bluth
 Ron Howard as Narrator (uncredited)

Episodes

Reception

Critical response
On Rotten Tomatoes, the season has an approval rating of 100% with an average score of 8.7 out of 10 based on 10 reviews. The website's critical consensus reads, "Arrested Developments solid third season plays out just like the first two: fast, funny, and with a felony charge."

Awards and nominations 
In 2006, the third season received four Emmy nominations, for Outstanding Comedy Series, Outstanding Supporting Actor in a Comedy Series (Will Arnett), Outstanding Single-Camera Picture Editing for a Comedy Series and Outstanding Writing for a Comedy Series for the series finale "Development Arrested".

Home media
The third season was released on DVD in region 1 on August 29, 2006, in region 2 on April 23, 2007 and in region 4 on December 6, 2006. Special features include commentary by creator Mitchell Hurwitz and cast members on "Forget Me Now", "Mr. F" and "Development Arrested"; deleted and extended scenes; blooper reel; "The Last Day on Location" featurette.

References

External links 
 

 
2005 American television seasons
2006 American television seasons